Elburz is an unincorporated community in Elko County, Nevada, United States. It is located along Interstate 80 between Elko and Wells.

The first permanent settlement at Elburz was made before 1910. The community received its name from the railroad.

References

External links

Unincorporated communities in Nevada
Unincorporated communities in Elko County, Nevada
Elko, Nevada micropolitan area